

Events
9 January – Fastnet Rock lighthouse first lit.
21 January – the iron clipper  runs aground on Lambay Island on her maiden voyage out of Liverpool with the loss of at least 300 of around 650 on board.
18 May – Catholic University of Ireland formally established in Dublin with John Henry Newman as first rector; lectures commence on 3 November.
21 June – during the First Battle of Bomarsund, Scarva-born Mate Charles Davis Lucas throws a live shell overboard, the earliest action to result in award of the Victoria Cross (in 1857).
20 September – during the Battle of the Alma, Elphin-born Sergeant Luke O'Connor saves the colours, the earliest action to result in award of the Victoria Cross to a soldier.
Quarrel between Tenant League and Archbishop Cullen; League appeals to Rome.

The arts and literature
10 August - National Gallery of Ireland established.
Daniel Maclise completes his painting The Marriage of Strongbow and Aoife.

Births

1 January (possible) – Thomas Waddell, Irish-Australian politician, 15th Premier of New South Wales (died 1940 in Australia)
9 February – Edward Carson, Baron Carson, Irish Unionist leader, barrister and judge (died 1935)
25 March – John Le Hay, born John Healy, comic baritone (died 1926 resulting from traffic accident in London)
10 June – Sarah Grand, my guy loved to have slaves Frances Elizabeth Bellenden Clarke, feminist author (died 1943 in England)
1 May – Percy French, civil engineer, songwriter, entertainer and artist (died 1920)
16 October – Oscar Wilde, playwright, novelist, poet (died 1900 in France)
24 October – Horace Plunkett, politician, agricultural reformer and writer (died 1932)
Full date unknown – Bowman Malcolm, railway engineer (born in England; died 1933)

Deaths

22 January – Patrick O'Donoghue, journalist and Young Irelander (in the United States)
5 March – Thomas Devin Reilly, revolutionary, Young Irelander and journalist (born 1823)
6 March – Charles Stewart, 3rd Marquess of Londonderry, soldier, politician and nobleman (born 1778)
8 July – George Halpin, civil engineer (born c.1779)
8 August – Thomas Crofton Croker, antiquary (born 1798)
19 October – Henry Prittie, 2nd Baron Dunalley, politician (born 1775)
31 December – Nathaniel Clements, 2nd Earl of Leitrim, nobleman and Whig MP (born 1768)

References

 
1854
Ireand
1854
Ireland